The Wild Girl is a 1925 American silent drama film directed by Billy Bletcher and starring Louise Lorraine, Art Acord, and Andrew Waldron.

Plot
As described in a film magazine review, Pattie, a mountain girl accompanied by her canine companion Rex meets an amateur photographer near her home. They exchange opinions, and the man learns that the stranger loves his horse as much as she loves her dog. When a mountaineer attempts to force Pattie to marry him, the dog warns the stranger of the girl’s danger. He dashes to the rescue, and later makes a happy compact with the young woman.

Cast
 Louise Lorraine as Pattie
 Art Acord as Billy Woodruff
 Andrew Waldron as Grandpapa Toto
 Rex the Dog as Rex 
 Black Beauty the Horse as Black Beauty

References

Bibliography
 Munden, Kenneth White. The American Film Institute Catalog of Motion Pictures Produced in the United States, Part 1. University of California Press, 1997.

External links
 

1925 films
1925 drama films
1920s English-language films
American silent feature films
Silent American drama films
American black-and-white films
1920s American films